Erber may refer to:

Erber Burgos (born 1969), retired Salvadoran football player
Erich Erber (born 1953), Austrian entrepreneur
Gerhard Erber (1934–2021), German classical pianist and academic teacher
James Erber (born 1951), British composer of the New Complexity school
Josef Erber (1897–1987), SS-Oberscharführer at Auschwitz concentration camp
Josef Erber (naturalist), natural history dealer in Vienna
Laura Erber (born 1979), Brazilian writer and visual artist
Lew Erber (1934–1990), American football coach